Yeniköy is a village in Ödemiş district of İzmir Province, Turkey. It is situated to the west of Ödemiş. The population of Yeniköy was 1011. as of 2011.

References

Villages in Ödemiş District